Calonotos metallicus is a moth of the subfamily Arctiinae. It was described by Herbert Druce in 1886. It is found in Panama.

References

Arctiinae
Moths described in 1886